Friends Missionary Prayer Band (FMPB) is a missionary movement of Indian Christians.

History

Founding 
The movement's main emphasis in its early period was the evangelization of India.

In 1937, the World Gospel Mission started the South India Bible Institute (now SIBS Ministries), which in turn created the Vacation Bible School movement in India. In 1952, in a small village called Kovilpatti in south Tamil Nadu, a VBS session was held with 75 children and 8 teachers.  This was led by P. Samuel.  He was helped by a small number of other young people, including Sam Kamalesan, Emil Jebasingh, JTK Daniel, John Christopher, and Theodore Williams. 

From 26–30 December 1959 at 211, Dhanaskodi Street, Kovilpatti of Tirunelveli district of Tamil Nadu, nearly 25 Vacation Bible School Friends (committed young people) gathered. They started a Praying Movement which was later named Friends Missionary Prayer Band. At the time it was declared a praying group, not an organization, church or, society. The first president of the FMPB was Mr. Theodore Williams and the first General Secretary was Miss Angela James. Theodore Williams, Emil Jebasingh, John Christopher (Christopher Sir), JTK Daniel, and Patrick Joshua met for prayer at Pannaivilai - a small village in Tirunelveli. Many of them were school teachers at Tucker Higher Secondary School. They developed into larger prayer groups and started yearly Gideon Camps in Pannaivilai. This village was visited in the 19th Century by the missionary Emy Carmichael along with the Saint Revd Isaaku Abhram, a local Indian clergy. This group began to start small prayer cells in every city of Tamil Nadu. Bishop Jebaraj of the Tirunelveli Diocese was the first Patron of the FMPB. Later, Bishop Leslie Newbigin of Madras Diocese became the Patron of this movement. Following his advice, the constitution of FMPB incorporated in its constitution the three historic creeds of the universal church to be added to the statement of faith of the Organization. 

In 1960 the group launched Araikooval, a prayer bulletin, which was published twice a year. Money raised from the magazine was sent to other missions and missionaries.

Mission work
During summer vacation in 1965 and 1966, the friends of FMPB conducted outreach work among the remote corners of Tamil Nadu. One team went to Pettamugulalam in Panchamalai (Periyamalai), a hill close to Hosur, about 100 km from Bangalore, and started a permanent mission. This challenge was brought to the notice of the friends who had gathered at Koilpatti on April 30, 1967 for a Mission Challenge Meeting (namely ‘Araikooval’) organized by the FMPB. Harris Hilton became the first missionary with the full support of his wife Padma Hilton. They were dedicated and sponsored by the BHEL Thiruvarambur prayer group, Trichirapalli, Tamil Nadu. 

The first mission station was started on June 9, 1967 at Periamalai. Harris Hilton, Dr. Pushparaj and Emil Jebasingh, then General Secretary, landed in Periamalai.  They bought a piece of land from Chendurayane Chetty and called the location Jehovah Jireh. Esau and John Jacob joined Hilton in the same year. In 1968 the first office of FMPB was started in the house of Swamy Adiyal in Sayerpuram, where it was registered as a Society. 

The movement's vision enlarged, and the first mission field was opened in North India in 1971 with the eventual aim to reach the whole of India. Daisy Hilkiah and her husband were sent to Bhasti in Uttar Pradesh on 23 July 1971.

In 1972 a ten-year plan was formulated which included the following goals for 1982:

11 states-  Jammu Kashmir, Punjab, Haryana, Himachal, Rajasthan, Uttar Pradesh, Madhya Pradesh, Bihar, Maharashtra, Gujarat, Orissa.
220 districts
440 missionaries

Trichirapalli prayer group leaders Hemachandran and Jacob organized the first sponsoring of the Missionary prayer group, and financially supported Mr. Harris Hilton's family. The first convert of the mission was Raman, who was the runner in the Postal department. He and Allimuthu of Periamalai were baptized in 1979 at Bethel, Danishpet. Simon Roberts became the full-time promotional secretary. The group's yearly income reached up to Rs. 10,000/-.

Evangelization of the nation was its prime target. Operation Mobilization trained the missionaries in Literature evangelism. Open air preaching and distributing Christian literature in the form of tracts began. Gospel portions, New Testaments, and Bibles were also distributed.

From 1987-97 the group had the "People movement" (the decade of harvest among people groups).

From 1997 to 2000 the group partnered with other Christian agencies.

In 2004 the group integrated Kukna churches with the CNI Gujarat Diocese. In 2006 the Malto churches were integrated with ECI.

Office bearers
The first Office bearer of the Friends Missionary Prayer Band
Patron:      		Rt. Rev. A.G. Jebaraj. Bishop, Tirunelveli diocese
President: 		Mr. Theodore Williams
Vice-President:	             Mr. P. Samuel
Treasurer: 		Mr. G.D. Samuel & Mr. A. Sathiyasingh
Secretary: 		Mr. Visuvasam Sathya

Regional Leaders
Trichy and Tanjore:     Miss. A. James A.D. Dhanaraj
Madurai-Ramanad:    Mrs. T. Samuel and Mr. F. Selveraj
Tirunelveli :	        Mrs. Rajapandian and Mr. G.D. Samuel
Kanyakumari: 	        Mr. A.G Arnold
Youth Leader:            Mr. S.P.R. Ebenezer

Basic structure of FMPB

There are three major divisions in FMPB. One is the group's headquarters, which is home to general Administration, Finance, Communication, and HRD. The second division is the mission mobilization department which raises and manages resources like manpower and funding. The third is the mission field department, which manages missionaries. 

FMPB is registered as a society with the Government of Tamil Nadu (S). 

The General body is the supreme body which controls this organization. It appointed a board called the Executive Committee, which makes the policies for the organization. President, Vice-President, Treasurer and the General Secretary are the key official positions.

Activity 
Through the work of Indian missionaries, over 1150 churches have been established, with over 6600 congregations.

References

External links

Christian missions in India
Christian organizations established in 1958
1958 establishments in India